SafeToNet is a British cyber-security company headquartered in London, with offices in San Francisco, Cologne and Toronto. The company uses artificial intelligence (AI) and behavioural analytics to help safeguard children by detecting threats such as cyberbullying, sextortion, abuse and aggression.

History 
SafeToNet was founded by Richard Pursey, Sharon Pursey, Georgina Pursey, Jack Pursey and Ted Hailey in October 2013, and its products were first launched in July 2017. In June 2018, SafeToNet acquired AI startup VISR, and raised $13 million in Series A private placement led by London based venture capital firm, West Hill Capital.

Awards and recognition

Awards 
 November 2016 - Pride of Reading's "Entrepreneur of the Year" to co-founder and CEO Richard Pursey
 November 2016 - Winner of KPMG's "Best British Mobile Start-Up" competition for the South West England
 November 2016 - SafeToNet wins BT Infinity Lab 'mobile innovation' competition
March 2017 - Winner of KPMG’s "Best British Mobile Start-Up" competition at Mobile World Congress in Barcelona
 September 2017 - GoIgnite Global Call's "Consumer Experience AI" award 
 October 2017 - "Rising Star Award" by Women in Business to Co-founder Sharon for her work with SafeToNet
 November 2017 - Thames Valley Business Magazine Awards for "Best Use of Technology"

Recognition 
 March 2017 - Featured in RealBusiness publication's "The 50 most disruptive UK companies in 2017: The Future 50"
June 2017 - Featured in Businesscloud UK's "101 tech start-up disrupter's list" for 2017
 Recognised by Cisco as one of the UK and Ireland's top 50 cyber security start-ups (the Cisco50 programme)
February 2018 - SafeToNet won the GSMA D-Lab competition cyberbullying prevention software
SafeToNet is one of 5 companies worldwide to be a member of the Go-Ignite accelerator (a consortium of Deutsche Telekom, Telefonica, Singtel and Orange)

Relationship between the SafeToNet Foundation and SafeToNet Ltd. 
SafeToNet Foundation is a registered UK charity, SafeToNet Ltd is a commercial enterprise and funds the SafeToNet Foundation. Both are concerned with safeguarding children in the Digital Context. While SafeToNet does this using technology and applications, the SafeToNet Foundation does this through education, information, finding projects and research. The SafeToNet Foundation also works with subject matter experts to rehabilitate any victims from cyber-abuse.

References

External links 
 
SafeToNet Foundation Official Website

Software companies of England
Software companies established in 2013
Companies based in the London Borough of Southwark
2013 establishments in England
British companies established in 2013
Child safety